Tasikmalaya Station (TSM) also known as Tasik Station is a large class type C railway station located in Lengkongsari, Tawang, Tasikmalaya. The station, which is located at an altitude of +349 meters, is included in the Bandung Operational Area II. All trains that pass through the Kroya–Bandung line must stop at this station.

Services
The following is a list of train services at the Tasikmalaya Station.

Passenger services
 Executive class
 Mixed class
 Economy class
 Serayu, to  via – and to  via

Freight services
 Over Night Services, to  via –– and to

References

External links
 

Tasikmalaya
Railway stations in West Java
Railway stations opened in 1893
Cultural Properties of Indonesia in West Java
Dutch colonial architecture in Indonesia